5 marines per 100 ragazze is a 1961 Italian "musicarello" comedy film directed by Mario Mattoli and starring Virna Lisi.

Cast
 Virna Lisi as Grazia
 Mario Carotenuto as Admiral Michigan
 Hélène Chanel as Elena 
 Little Tony as Tony Collina
 Vittorio Congia as Charlie
  as Aurora
 Paul Wynter as Sam
 Raffaella Carrà as Mirella
 Sergio Raimondi as Robert
Franco Franchi as Factotum 
Ciccio Ingrassia as Factotum
Pietro De Vico as Attendant
Bice Valori as Director
Raimondo Vianello as General Patterson
Ugo Tognazzi as Sgt. Imparato

References

External links

1961 films
Italian comedy films
1960s Italian-language films
1961 comedy films
Films directed by Mario Mattoli
Films scored by Gianni Ferrio
1960s Italian films
Musicarelli